Scott Palmer may refer to:

 Scott B. Palmer (born 1950), American political operative
 Scott Palmer (American football) (born 1948), American football player
 Scott Palmer (rugby union) (born 1977), New Zealand born Italian rugby union footballer

See also
 Scot Palmer (1937–2022), Australian sports journalist